Hauser Junior-Senior High School is a public high school located in Hope, Indiana.

See also
 List of high schools in Indiana

References

External links 
 Official Website

Public high schools in Indiana
Schools in Bartholomew County, Indiana